Kentucky Route 84 (KY 84) is a  state highway in Kentucky that runs from KY 401 southwest of Hudson to KY 49 and KY 52 in Lebanon via Eastview, Sonora, Hodgenville, and Raywick.

Major intersections

References

0084
Transportation in Breckinridge County, Kentucky
Transportation in Hardin County, Kentucky
Transportation in LaRue County, Kentucky
Transportation in Nelson County, Kentucky
Transportation in Marion County, Kentucky